The Luye Highlands are highlands close to Yong'an Village, Luye Township, Taitung County, Taiwan.

History
The highland is famous for its hot air balloons and paragliding activities. The Taiwan International Balloon Fiesta has been held here annually since 2011.

Geography
It has an average elevation of around 350 meters above sea level.

Transportation
The highlands are accessible north west from Luye Station of Taiwan Railways.

See also
 List of tourist attractions in Taiwan

References

Tourist attractions in Taitung County